Salavatabad (Kurdish: سلوات ئاوا ، سه له وات ئاوا) is a mountain range in the west part of Sanandaj city, Kurdistan Province, western Iran.

It is one a subrange of Zagros Mountains in the west of Iran.

Geography
The main road connecting Sanandaj to Hamedan crosses the mountains.   

The river of "Qeshlaq" (Kurdish:قشلاق), a branch of Sirvan River, runs adjacent to the mountain range.

Mountains of Iran
Landforms of Kurdistan Province
Zagros Mountains
Mountains of Kurdistan Province